Duff's Famous Wings is a restaurant in Amherst, New York, a suburb of Buffalo.

History
The restaurant was established in 1946 under the name "Duff's", referencing its founder, Louise Duffney. In 1985, the restaurant was renamed "Duff's Famous Wings" after Buffalo wings became its major selling point. Duff's Famous Wings is known throughout Western New York as having good chicken wings and is noted for its rivalry with the Anchor Bar, the bar credited with inventing the Buffalo wing. In 2014, Duff's partnered with the Buffalo Bills to announce that a version of Duff's Famous Wings was added to Ralph Wilson Stadium.

Duff's was founded in 1946 and has grown to compete against the Anchor Bar with five Buffalo-area locations, a location in Rochester, a Dallas-area location in Southlake, Texas, and three locations in the Toronto area.

See also
Buffalo wing
Anchor Bar
List of chicken restaurants

References

Restaurants established in 1946
1946 establishments in New York (state)
Restaurants in Buffalo, New York
Poultry restaurants